Emily Alvarado is an American politician and affordable housing advocate serving as a member of the Washington House of Representatives for the 34th district. Elected in November 2022, she assumed office on January 9, 2023.

Education 
Alvarado earned a Bachelor of Arts degree in American studies from Scripps College in 2005 and a Juris Doctor from the University of Washington School of Law.

Career 
From 2004 to 2006, Alvarado worked as a public affairs field organizer for Planned Parenthood of Southwestern Oregon. From 2009 to 2011, she was an advocacy project coordinator for the Housing Consortium of Everett & Snohomish County. From 2011 to 2013, she was the policy director of the Housing Development Consortium of Seattle–King County. Alvarado joined the Seattle Office of Housing in 2014 as manager of policy

and equitable development and became director in 2019. Since 2021, she has worked as a vice president of Enterprise Community Partners.  Alvarado was elected to the Washington House of Representatives in November 2022.

References 

Living people
Scripps College alumni
University of Washington School of Law alumni
Washington (state) lawyers
Washington (state) Democrats
Members of the Washington House of Representatives
Politicians from Seattle
Year of birth missing (living people)